María Chacón  (born María Fernanda Chacón Romo) is a Mexican actress, and singer.

Filmography

Television

Discography

References

Living people
Year of birth missing (living people)
21st-century Mexican actresses
Mexican women singers
People from Ensenada, Baja California
Singers from Baja California
Actresses from Baja California